Pinchas Cohen Gan (born November 3, 1942) is an Israeli painter and mixed-media artist. He was awarded the Sandberg Prize (1979), the Culture and Sport Ministry's prize for his life's work (2005), and the Israel Prize in Art (2008).

Biography
Pinchas Cohen Gan was born in 1942 in Meknes, Morocco, to an observant Jewish upper-middle-class family.  His father, Moshe HaCohen, was a painter who left his art to support his family as a merchant; and his mother, Rivka Gan, worked as a French teacher.  He studied in a Talmud Torah where they also taught mathematics.  In 1949 he made Aliyah to Israel with his parents and four brothers on the ship “Kedma,” and he grew up in Kiryat Bialik, in a neighborhood of German immigrants.  In his youth, Cohen Gan also worked in construction in order to help support his family.  He later described his feelings of loneliness as an Eastern Jew growing up in Israeli society in the early days of the State.  As a young boy he was already interested in art and studied sculpture with Aharon Ashkenazi.

In 1954 he joined the youth movement “Hashomer Hatzair” [The Youth Guard] and continued as a counselor in the movement until he went into the army.  He did his military service in a unit of Nahal [unit combining military service with work on an agricultural settlement].  In 1962 he left Kibbutz Lehavot HaBashan and moved to Jerusalem, where he began studies at the Bezalel Academy of Arts and Design, but he had to leave his studies after about a week because of lack of funding.  He returned to Haifa, where he studied drawing with Marcel Janco and sculpture with Michael Gross at Oranim Academic College.  In 1967 he began studying for a second time at Bezalel.  In 1968, during his studies there, he was wounded in a terrorist attack in the Mahane Yehuda Market.

Activity, 1972-1975
During the 1970s Cohen Gan created a variety of activities, some of them performance art.  On February 22, 1972, an exhibition of 20 of his engravings opened, including those created while he worked in the stable of Kibbutz Nirim. The works, which were hung above the cows’ water troughs, made use of the techniques of photographic etching combined with aquatint. The subjects included images of buildings or human beings, to some of whom Cohen Gan added colored strings that he glued to the paper.  Publicity for the exhibition, as an experiment in breaking established habits of looking at art, in addition to the anecdotal nature of the event, led to Cohen Gan's becoming famous and to his works being exhibited in the Dugit Gallery in Tel Aviv.

Other projects took on a more avant garde character, in that he did not put a conservative art object at their center.  As part of “The Dead Sea Project,” which was created between 1972 and 1973, Cohen Gan created plastic sleeves that stretched from a spring in Ein Feshkha, south of Einot Tzukim (“Cliff Springs”), to the Dead Sea and floated on top of it.  Within the plastic sleeves Cohen Gan raised fish, as a symbol of cultural isolation and in an attempt to integrate essential principles into the landscape.  
Other projects were of a more sharply political nature. In “Activities in Refugee Camps in Jericho” (February 10, 1974), for example, Cohen Gan erected a tent in a refugee camp near Jericho.  In “Touching the Border” (January 7, 1974) Cohen Gan placed demographic information about Israel on steel bars that he placed on four of the country's borders, in places where security forces stopped him.  These activities and others were displayed at an exhibition in the Israel Museum in 1974.

While the obvious content of these works hints at political issues, questions such as alienation, immigration, refugees, and mental states, expressed in the issue of the status of various ethnic groups in Israeli society, make up the hidden content. 
In 1974 he met his partner, the architect Aya Wald, at the opening of an exhibition of the works of Robert Rauschenberg at the Israel Museum. The two of them were together until 1980.

Figure, Form, Formula, 1972-1975
During the second half of the 1970s Cohen Gan lived in New York City and studied at Columbia University.  Among other things, he studied with the art historian Meyer Schapiro.  During this period he mounted several exhibits at the gallery of Bertha Urdang and at the galleries of Max Protech in New York and Washington, D.C. Some of the works were painted on tablecloths acquired from a hotel that had gone into bankruptcy.

The art which Cohen Gan began to produce from this period abandoned conceptual “activity” for more traditional art objects. In 1978 he mounted a solo exhibition of new works in the Tel Aviv Museum of Art under the Name “Works After the Concept.”   Sarah Breitberg Semel, curator of the exhibition, presented Cohen Gan's new works as expressing his disappointment with the combining of science and art, a combination that characterized the early conceptual works of Cohen Gan.  At the same time Cohen Gan declared that he was not interested in concentrating on the graphic quality of works of art, but rather on an attempt to decrease the distance between the idea and its visual expression. In the eyes of the art critics, the works were perceived as “conceptual painting,” and as a retreat from the severe conceptualism of Cohen Gan's early works.  Adam Baruch remarked about the exhibition that Cohen Gan was trying to create a human “idea picture.”

A common motif in these works is the conflict between “art” and “science.”  This conflict signified what Cohen Gan called “the theory of relative art” – an epistemology within the framework of the laws of artistic creativity perceived as a system of dynamic attributions of culture and the varying laws of nature.

In the series of works entitled “Conflicts in formula and painting” (1982), for example, Cohen Gan divided the canvas into two parts. On the upper part of the canvas Cohen Gan painted a richly colored expressive work with anatomical human figures adorning it, comprising an innovation in painting when viewed against the background of conceptual art in Israel and the United States.  On the lower part of the painting were three-dimensional body parts and formulas on a white background. The formulas were an expression of philosophical-esthetic texts, in which Cohen Gan divided artistic activity into units and the connections between them, and presented them as a linguistic-mathematical system.

In other works of this period, such as “The Other Science in Gray” (1982) or “Israeli Paradigm of the Prodigal Son No.1” (1982), a large number of images appear.  Mordechai Omer pointed out with regard to the relationship between the images and the background in these works that they create a sealed space, that in spite of its tangibility, we were “unable to sense.”

Another expression of his preoccupation with the concept of space appears in works such as those exhibited in the series of works entitled “Area Drawings, Space Drawings, Abyss Drawings” (1981) in the Gimel Gallery, Jerusalem, and in the installation “Programmed Figure in Curved Space, or Painted Solution to Advance Problem no. 457617” (1981) in the Noemi Givon Gallery, Tel Aviv.  In this installation Cohen Gan built sophisticated geometric bodies in wooden frames covered in painted canvas that comprised an attempt to examine the conventions of Euclidean geometry as an expression of his occupation with the epistemology of art.

Processing history
During the 1980s Cohen Gan converted the image of the anonymous figure into the image of the head without a body.  The use of this floating image also made possible the change in the composition of Cohen Gan's works, which became more expressive.  The unattached head, according to Mordechai Omer, symbolizes the lack of fusion between body and soul.  In the places in which Cohen Gan continued to use an entire figure, he used line drawings, similar to stick figures.

In spite of the fact that even in his early works he relates to political and social issues, in the 1980s and 1990s he gives more attention to historical events.  In a newspaper interview Cohen Gan contended that “all the philosophizing about the painful human problem has turned it into an esthetic problem.”

In addition to his treatment of the relation between East and West in culture, Cohen Gan devoted considerable space in his work to the Holocaust.  In 1988, for example, he led a demonstration outside the Museum of Modern Art in New York City, which was exhibited at that time an exhibition of the work of the artist Anselm Kiefer.  The carried a sign that read “Anselm Kiefer is the artist that Adolf Hitler wasn’t,” in protest against the process of legitimization that Germany was undergoing under the auspices of Kiefer's art. Within his treatment of this topic, the works that stand out most are those in the exhibition “And These Are the Names,” which was mounted as part of the Israeli exhibition at the Biennale in Istanbul, Turkey, in October 1992.  In this exhibition Cohen displayed works dedicated to various Jewish communities from Europe and the Near East that perished in the Holocaust.

In 1991, in light of his contribution of 300 of his works to the Tel Aviv Museum of Art, a retrospective exhibition of his works on paper was mounted at the Helena Rubinstein Pavilion for Contemporary Art.  At the time Cohen Gan was living in Paris, where he had been given a studio for half a year in “la Cite” artists’ quarter.

In addition to his work as an artist, during these years Cohen Gan continued to write articles on esthetics in which he also included various biographical treatments.  The most important of these is “Dictionary of the Syntax of Painting and Sculpture,” which contained a fictitious dictionary of 200 entries translated into 6 languages.  His book, "Art, Law, and the Social Order,"  documents his 1993 legal battle against the Bezalel Academy of Arts and Design in an attempt to receive the same conditions as a professor of Art that professors of science receive.

In 1995 he was awarded the Dizengoff Prize for his life's work, and in 2008 he won the Israel Prize in Painting.

Gallery

Education
 1967–70 Bezalel Academy of Arts and Design Academy of Art, Jerusalem, advanced studies
 1971 Central School of Art, London
 1971–73 B.A. social sciences and art, Hebrew University, Jerusalem
 1975–77 M.F.A. in arts, Columbia University of Arts, New York

Teaching
 1971–75 Bezalel Academy of Arts and Design, Jerusalem

Awards and prizes 
 1978 America-Israel Cultural Foundation
 1978 Isaac Stern Creativity Prize
 1979 Sandberg Prize, Israel Museum, Jerusalem
 1991 Eugene Kolb Prize for Israeli Graphics
 1991 Minister of Education Prize
 1999 Acquisition Prize, Tel Aviv Museum
 2005 Prize for Life's Work in Plastic Art, Ministry of Education
 2005 Gan was awarded the Dizengoff Prize for Painting.
 2008 The Israel Prize in painting.

Solo exhibitions (selection)

See also
List of Israel Prize recipients

References

Further reading
 Barron, S. & M. Tuchman, Seven Artists in Israel 1948–1978.  Arie Aroch, Pinchas Cohen Gan, Moshe Kupferman, Joshua Neustein, Nahum Tevet, Anna Ticho, Josef Zaritsky, Los Angeles, Los Angeles County Museum of Art, 1978.
 Beesch, Ruth K, Kristine Stiles & Peter Selz, Figure, Form, Formula: The Art of Pinchas Cohen Gan, University of North Carolina at Greensboro, 1996.
 Dvir Gallery, Pinchas Cohen Gan. Cosmos.Pathos. Chaos, Tel-Aviv, Dvir Gallery, 1988.
 Israel Museum, Pinchas Cohen Gan, Jerusalem: Israel Museum, 1974.

External links
Pinchas Cohen Gan at the Israel Museum. Retrieved 5 February 2012
 
 

1942 births
Living people
Jewish sculptors
Jewish Israeli artists
Israeli male sculptors
Modern sculptors
Israel Prize in painting recipients
Sandberg Prize recipients
Moroccan emigrants to Israel
20th-century Moroccan Jews
People from Meknes
Bezalel Academy of Arts and Design alumni
Hebrew University of Jerusalem alumni
Columbia University School of the Arts alumni
People from Tel Aviv
Alumni of the Central School of Art and Design
Israeli contemporary artists